University of Lakki Marwat is a public sector university located at Lakki Marwat town of Khyber Pakhtunkhwa  in Pakistan.

Overview and history 
University of Lakki Marwat is established by Government of Khyber Pakhtunwa in October 2017. It was originally a sub campus of University of Science and Technology Bannu and was established in 2014. The sub campus in Lakki Marwat was created by constant effort by the people of Lakki Marwat to have university in the district. The sub campus was created in Government Post Graduate College Lakki Marwat Campus. The campus initially offered research in 2 disciplines: Education & Research (IER) and Political Science. The Government of Khyber Pakhtunkhwa has upgraded the sub campus into full-fledged university in October 2017.
Currently, different departments are temporarily operated from various branch campuses. The construction work on the main campus is underway at the location of Dalo Khel.

Departments 
University of Lakki Marwat has currently the following departments.
 Department of Political Science
 Department of Education and Research
 Department of Botany
 Department of Zoology
 Department of Mathematics
 Department of English literature
 Department of Chemistry
 Department of Computer Science
 Department of Physics

The University of Lakki Marwat offers PhD programmes in different science subjects as well.

See also 
 University of Science And Technology Bannu
 University of Science And Technology Kohat
 University of Science And Technology Abboattabad
 Gomal University Dera Ismail Khan
 Government Post Graduate College Lakki Marwat

References 

Public universities and colleges in Khyber Pakhtunkhwa
Educational institutions established in 2017
2017 establishments in Pakistan
Lakki Marwat District